Alamo is an unincorporated town in Lincoln County, Nevada, United States, about  north of Las Vegas along U.S. Route 93. As of the 2010 census it had a population of 1,080.

History
A post office has been in operation at Alamo since 1905.  The community was named in commemoration of the Battle of the Alamo. A large share of the first settlers were Mormons.

Alamo banned alcohol sales due to the religious roots and principles of the settlers. Many of the residents are members of The Church of Jesus Christ of Latter-day Saints, and their faith "preaches abstinence from alcohol". In 2022, the town board proposed allowing alcohol sales in gas stations and supermarkets but continue to restrict bars.

Geography
Alamo lies in the Pahranagat Valley. Its economy is dependent primarily upon ranching. The closest attraction is the Pahranagat National Wildlife Refuge.

Between Alamo and the town of Rachel is the site of the Devonian Alamo Impact Breccia.

Demographics

Tourism
Alamo attracts tourists and truckers traveling from Las Vegas to northern Nevada and Idaho. Attractions include the nearby warm springs, wildlife refuge, Extraterrestrial Highway and Area 51. Gas stations in Alamo cater to these tourists by offering alien memorabilia. There are two truck stops, the Alamo Sinclair, the Ash Springs Shell, that offer large diesel filling areas to attract passing truckers. There are also two open motels in Alamo, the Alamo Inn and Sunset View Inn.

Transportation
 Alamo Landing Field

Education
Public education is provided by the Lincoln County School District, with offices in Panaca, Nevada. There are three schools in the valley.

Religion
There are three different religious denominations with churches in Alamo:

 Christian Bible Fellowship Church
 The Church of Jesus Christ of Latter-day Saints, who were early settlers of this area
 Trinity Assembly of God

Services
Alamo has a police force, a volunteer fire department, phone and internet services, a medical clinic, and a public library. Nevada Bank and Trust offers financial services to residents. Alamo's first radio station, KQLN 91.3 FM, went on the air on November 17, 2010, but the station's license was cancelled at licensee's request, effective on July 2, 2013.

Climate

References

Census-designated places in Nevada
Census-designated places in Lincoln County, Nevada
Unincorporated towns in Nevada
Populated places established in 1901